Firouz Pojhan (October 3, 1926 – 1996) was an Iranian weightlifter who was a member of Iran senior national weightlifting team. He participated at the 1951 and 1958 Asian Games, in which he won the gold medal of both events in his division, and the 1951, 1957 and 1958 World Weightlifting Championships, in which he won the bronze medal of all events in his division. He also partook in the 1952 and 1956 Summer Olympics.

References

Iranian male weightlifters
Iranian strength athletes
1926 births
1996 deaths
World Weightlifting Championships medalists
Weightlifters at the 1952 Summer Olympics
Weightlifters at the 1956 Summer Olympics
Olympic weightlifters of Iran
Asian Games gold medalists for Iran
Asian Games medalists in weightlifting
Weightlifters at the 1951 Asian Games
Weightlifters at the 1958 Asian Games
Medalists at the 1951 Asian Games
Medalists at the 1958 Asian Games
20th-century Iranian people